Ufford may refer to the following places in England:

 Ufford, Cambridgeshire
 Ufford, Suffolk